The Cuttack Development Authority (CDA) is an agency which is responsible for development and beautification of Cuttack, the Silver city of Odisha, India. It was established on 1 September 1983. 

CDA is responsible for creating development plans, regulating development and land use, constructing housing colonies, commercial complexes, and providing public amenities like water supply, drainage, sewerage, transportation, and social facilities.

External links
 Official Website of Cuttack Development Authority

Cuttack
State agencies of Odisha
State urban development authorities of India
Government agencies established in 1983
1983 establishments in Orissa